Prenalterol is a cardiac stimulant which acts as a β1 adrenoreceptor agonist.

Synthesis

Stereospecific
Prenalterol exhibits adrenergic agonist activity in spite of an interposed oxymethylene group. The stereospecific synthesis devised for this molecule relies on the fact that the side chain is very similar in oxidation state to that of a sugar.

Condensation of monobenzone (2) with the epoxide derived from α-D-glucofuranose affords the glycosylated derivative (3). Hydrolytic removal of the acetonide protecting groups followed by cleavage of the sugar with periodate gives aldehyde (4). This is reduced to the glycol by means of NaBH4 and the terminal alcohol is converted to the mesylate (5). Displacement of the leaving group with isopropylamine followed by hydrogenolytic removal of the O-benzyl ether affords the β1-adrenergic selective adrenergic agonist prenalterol (6).

Racemic
Prepns of the racemic mixture:  corresp to H. Köppe et al.,  (1965, 1972 both to Boehringer Ingelheim);  corresp to A. F. Crowther, L. H. Smith,  (1965, 1970 both to ICI);

Further reading

See also
 Primidolol
Xamoterol

References

Secondary alcohols
Amines
Beta1-adrenergic agonists
Cardiac stimulants
Inotropic agents
Phenol ethers
Phenols